Time Will Tell: A Tribute to Bob Marley is an album by Bunny Wailer, released through Shanachie Records in 1990. In 1991, the album won Wailer the Grammy Award for Best Reggae Recording.

Track listing
All songs by Bob Marley, unless noted otherwise.

 "Soul Rebel"
 "I Shot the Sheriff"
 "Time Will Tell"
 "Bellyfull"
 "Redemption Song"
 "No Woman, No Cry" 
 "Slave Driver"
 "War" 
 "Crazy Baldhead" 
 "Rebel Music"

Personnel
Bunny Wailer – vocals, percussion
Dwight Pinkney, Eric "Bingy Bunny" Lamont, Owen "Fox" Stewart, Radcliffe "Dougie" Bryan, Noel "Sowell" Bailey – guitar
Robbie Shakespeare, Errol "Flabba" Holt, Daniel "Danny Axeman" Thompson, Richard Walters – bass
Sly Dunbar, Carlton "Santa" Davis, Lincoln "Style" Scott - drums
Keith Sterling, Wycliffe "Steely" Johnson, Tony Asher – keyboards
"Deadly" Headley Bennett, Dean Fraser, Ronald "Nambo" Robinson – horns
Uziah "Sticky" Thompson – percussion
Marcia Griffiths, The Psalms – background vocals

References

1990 albums
Bunny Wailer albums
Grammy Award for Best Reggae Album
Shanachie Records albums
Bob Marley tribute albums